Filopaludina sumatrensis is a species of large freshwater snail with a gill and an operculum, an aquatic gastropod mollusk in the family Viviparidae.

Subspecies
 Filopaludina sumatrensis peninsularis Brandt, 1974
 Filopaludina sumatrensis polygramma (Martens, 1860)
 Filopaludina sumatrensis speciosa (Deshayes, 1876)
 Filopaludina sumatrensis sumatrensis (Dunker, 1852) represented as Filopaludina sumatrensis (Dunker, 1852) (alternate representation)

Distribution 
This species is found in Cambodia, Indonesia, Laos, Malaysia, Myanmar, Singapore, Thailand and Vietnam.

Description
The width of the shell is 21 mm. The height of the shell is 32 mm.

References

 Brandt R. A. M. (1974). The non-marine aquatic Mollusca of Thailand. Archiv für Molluskenkunde. 105: i–iv, 1–423

External links

Viviparidae